The Numismatic Circular is an international periodical published by Spink since 1892 based in London. Now published six times a year, the Circular offers coins, books and banknotes for sale at fixed prices and features articles of numismatic interest. It is believed to be the oldest such publication in existence.

References

Numismatics journals